Robert J. S. Page was the second mayor of the Village (now City) of Flint, Michigan serving from 1856 to 1857.

Early life
Page was an attorney who came to Flint in 1838.  On October 22, 1844, he was appointed receiver in the Genesee District office of the U.S. Land Office.

Political life
In 1850, he was selected to serve in the office of justice of the peace serving until 1851.  He was elected as the second mayor of the Village of Flint in 1856 serving a one-year term.  Later, he serve on the bench as a probate judge.

References

American justices of the peace
Mayors of Flint, Michigan
Michigan lawyers
19th-century American politicians
19th-century American judges
19th-century American lawyers